AnyDesk is a remote desktop application distributed by AnyDesk Software GmbH. The proprietary software program provides platform independent remote access to personal computers and other devices running the host application. It offers remote control, file transfer, and VPN functionality. AnyDesk is often used in technical support scams and other remote access scams.

Company
AnyDesk Software GmbH was founded in 2014 in Stuttgart, Germany and has gone worldwide, with subsidiaries in the US, China, and Hong Kong, as well as an Innovation Hub in Georgia.

In May 2018, AnyDesk secured 6.5 million Euros of funding in a Series A round led by EQT Ventures. Another round of investment in January 2020 brings AnyDesk to over 20 million Dollars of combined funding.

Software
AnyDesk uses a proprietary video codec "DeskRT" that is designed to allow users to experience higher-quality video and sound transmission while reducing the transmitted amount of data to the minimum. 

With its three megabyte total program size, AnyDesk is an especially lightweight application.

AnyDesk partnered with remote monitoring and management and mobile device management services, such as Atera and Microsoft Intune.

Features 
Availability of features is dependent upon the license of the individual user. Some main features include:

 Remote access for multiple operating systems (Windows, Linux, macOS, iOS, Android, etc.)
 File transfer and manager
 Remote Print
 VPN
 Unattended access
 Whiteboard
 Auto-Discovery (automatic analysis of local network)
 Chat-Function
 REST-API
 Custom-Clients
 Session protocol 
 Two-Factor-Authentication
 Individual host-server

Security 
AnyDesk uses TLS-1.2 with authenticated encryption. Every connection between AnyDesk-Clients is secured with AES-256. When a direct network connection can be established, the session is endpoint encrypted and its data is not routed through AnyDesk servers. Additionally, whitelisting of incoming connections is possible.

Abuses 
AnyDesk is one of many tools used in technical support scams and other remote access scams. It can be optionally installed on computers and smartphones with full administrative permissions, if the user chooses to do so. This provides the host user with full access to the guest computer over the Internet, and, like all remote desktop applications, is a severe security risk if connected to an untrusted host.

Mobile access fraud 
In February 2019, Reserve Bank of India warned of an emerging digital banking fraud, explicitly mentioning AnyDesk as the attack channel. The general scam procedure is as follows: fraudsters get victims to download AnyDesk from the Google Play Store on their mobile phone, usually by mimicking the customer service of legitimate companies. Then, the scammers convince the victim to provide the nine-digit access code and to grant certain permissions. After permissions are obtained and if no other security measures are in place, the scammers usually transfer money using the Indian Unified Payment Interface. A similar scam took place in 2020 according to Kashmir Cyber police. The same method of theft is widely used internationally on either mobile phones or computers: a phone call convinces a person to allow connection to their device, typically from a caller claiming to be a service provider to "solve problems with the computer/phone", warning that Internet service will otherwise be disconnected, or from a caller claiming to be a financial institution because "there have been suspicious withdrawal attempts from your account".

Bundling with ransomware 
In May 2018, the Japanese cybersecurity firm Trend Micro discovered that cybercriminals bundled a new ransomware variant with AnyDesk, possibly as an evasion tactic masking the true purpose of the ransomware while it performs its encryption routine.

Technical support scams 

Scammers have been known to use AnyDesk and similar remote desktop software to obtain full access to the victims' computer by impersonating a technical support person. The victim is asked to download and install AnyDesk and provide the attackers with access. When access is obtained, the attackers can control the computer and move personal files and sensitive data.

In 2017, the UK based ISP TalkTalk banned TeamViewer and similar software from all its networks after scammers cold called victims and talked them into giving access to their computer. The software was removed from the blacklist after setting up a scam warning. In September 2021, the State Bank of India warned customers not to install AnyDesk or similar apps. In March 2022, the Federal Bureau of Investigation issued a cybersecurity advisory noting that AnyDesk software was used in the operations of the AvosLocker ransomware gang.

See also 
 Comparison of remote desktop software
 Virtual Network Computing

References

External links 
 

Software companies of Germany
Remote desktop
Remote desktop software for Linux
Remote administration software
Windows remote administration software
MacOS remote administration software
Linux remote administration software
Portable software
Proprietary cross-platform software
Virtual Network Computing
Web conferencing